"Summer" is a song by Australian-New Zealand group Dragon, released on 18 September 1989 as the fourth single to be released from the group's ninth studio album Bondi Road (1989). "Summer" peaked at No. 57 on the ARIA charts.

Track listing 
 "Summer" (Marc Hunter, David Hirschfelder, Wendy Hunter) - 3:44
 "Heart of Fire" (Marc Hunter) -

Charts

References 

Dragon (band) songs
Songs written by Marc Hunter
1989 songs
1989 singles